Marsicovetere is a town of   and comune in the province of Potenza, in the Southern Italian region of Basilicata.

Geography
It is bounded by the comuni of Calvello, Grumento Nova, Marsico Nuovo, Paterno, Tramutola and Viggiano.

The other municipal hamlet is Barricelle.

History
Marsicovetere was an ancient city of the Marsi in the Agri River valley, later conquered by the Romans.
In the year 1000 it was seat of a county. In 1498 King Frederick IV of Naples donated it to the Caracciolo family, who held it until 1777 save a brief parenthesis under the Di Palmas. In 1860 it was annexed to the Kingdom of Italy.

References

External links

Cities and towns in Basilicata